A morgen was a unit of measurement of land area in Germany, the Netherlands, Poland, Lithuania and the Dutch colonies, including South Africa and Taiwan.

The word is identical with the German and Dutch word for "morning", because, similarly to the Imperial acre, it denoted the acreage that could be furrowed in a morning's time by a man behind an ox or horse dragging a single bladed plough. The morgen was commonly set at about 60–70% of the tagwerk (German for "day work") referring to a full day of ploughing. In 1869, the North German Confederation fixed the morgen at a  but in modern times most farmland work is measured in full hectares. The next lower measurement unit was the German "rute" or Imperial rod but the metric rod length of  never became popular.

Germany 
The following table shows an excerpt of morgen sizes as used in Germany - some morgen were used in a wider area and so they had proper names. The actual area of a morgen was considerably larger in fertile areas of Germany, or in regions where flat terrain prevails, presumably facilitating tilling. The next lower measurement unit to a morgen was usually in "Quadratruten" square rods.

Poland
The Polish terms for the unit were morga, mórg, jutrzyna, the latter being a near-literal translation into old Polish.

Austria–Hungary 

South Africa 
Until the advent of metrication in the 1970s, the morgen was the legal unit of measure of land in three of the four pre-1995 South African provinces – the Cape Province, the Orange Free State and the Transvaal. In November 2007 the South African Law Society published a conversion factor of 1 morgen = 0.856 532 hectares to be used "for the conversion of areas from imperial units to metric, particularly when preparing consolidated diagrams by compilation".

See also
Arpent
Dutch units of measurement
 German obsolete units of measurement
 List of unusual units of measurement

References 

Afrikaans words and phrases
Dutch words and phrases
Obsolete units of measurement
Units of area